Timothy Lyons (1935 – 10 July 1984) was an Irish Gaelic footballer. He played at club level with Cordal and Castleislands Desmonds and at inter-county level with the Kerry senior football team.

Career

Born near Castleisland, County Kerry, Lyons first came to Gaelic football prominence as a schoolboy with St Brendan's College in Killarney when his prowess saw him selected for the Munster Colleges' team in 1952-53. His subsequent studies at University College Dublin resulted in him winning three Sigerson Cup titles, while he also earned inclusion on the Combined Universities team. Lyons first appeared on the inter-county scene with the Kerry minor team in 1953, before making his senior debut in 1956. He was a regular on the team for much of the following decade and won his first All-Ireland Championship title in 1959 before claiming a second winners' medal in 1962. Lyons also won six Munster Championship titles and was involved in two National League title-winning teams.

Personal life and death

Lyons qualified from University College Dublin with a B.Sc.(Ag.) and began his professional career as permanent instructor at Pallaskenry Agricultural College. He later worked with Kerry county committee of agriculture as an adviser for 15 years before taking up the position of Head of Agriculture with Kerry Co-Op in 1973. Lyons died aged 49 at the Bon Secours Hospital in Tralee on 10 July 1984.

Career statistics

Honours

University College Dublin
Sigerson Cup: 1954, 1956, 1957

Castleisland Desmonds
Kerry Minor Football Championship: 1952

Kerry
All-Ireland Senior Football Championship: 1959, 1962
Munster Senior Football Championship: 1958, 1959, 1960, 1961, 1962, 1963
National Football League: 1958–59, 1960–61

References

1935 births
1984 deaths
Castleisland Gaelic footballers
UCD Gaelic footballers
Kerry inter-county Gaelic footballers
Munster inter-provincial Gaelic footballers